On March 8, 2005, a special election was held in the California's 5th congressional district to choose a U.S. Representative to replace Bob Matsui, who had died of pneumonia shortly after being re-elected in the 2004 elections. Matsui's wife, Doris, was quickly able to win support from the Democratic Party officials, and ended up winning over two-thirds of the vote in the special primary election, meaning a run-off would not be needed. As of 2021, this is the last time a widow succeeded their spouse in Congress.

Results

References 

California 2005 05
California 2005 05
2005 05 Special
California 05 Special
United States House of Representatives 05 Special
United States House of Representatives 2005 05